Kerson Hadley (born May 22, 1989 in Pohnpei) is a Micronesian swimmer. He competed at the 2008 Summer Olympics. He finished in 70th place in a time of 25.34s.

He qualified for the 2012 Summer Olympics in the Men's 50 metre freestyle where he ranked 40th. In London Olympics 2012 he won his heat in a time of 24.82s but it wasn't quick enough to qualify to the next round.

References

External links
 
Kerson Hadley

1989 births
Living people
People from Pohnpei State
Federated States of Micronesia male swimmers
Olympic swimmers of the Federated States of Micronesia
Swimmers at the 2008 Summer Olympics
Swimmers at the 2012 Summer Olympics